The 1955 Utah Redskins football team was an American football team that represented the University of Utah as a member of the Skyline Conference during the 1955 college football season. In their sixth season under head coach Jack Curtice, the Redskins compiled an overall record of 6–3 with a mark of 4–1 against conference opponents, plaching second in the Skyline.

Schedule

After the season

NFL Draft
Utah had two players selected in the 1956 NFL Draft.

References

Utah
Utah Utes football seasons
Utah Redskins football